Donnell Stadium, which was built in 1927 at a cost of $150,000, continues to serve as one of the stadiums of Ohio.

A gift for Findlay City School District from Otto D. Donnell, Donnell Stadium was the original dream of J.C. Donnell, president of the Ohio Oil Company. His presentation of the site where Donnell Middle School now stands was the first step in his dream.

On October 27, 1928, Donnell Stadium was dedicated and the deed to the stadium handed over to the Findlay Board of Education.

Over 80 years ago, James C. Donnell's dream of providing a place in Findlay where ‘games of youth’ could be conducted was realized by the citizens of Findlay.  Donnell, son of James C. Donnell, and then president of The Ohio Oil Company, the forerunner of today's Marathon Oil Company stood before a crowd of over 2,000 people and said, “We have endeavored to the best of our ability to carry out the plans in accordance with the wishes of the originator of this idea, and our only regret is that he was not spared to be present at the dedication and to share the happiness of this occasion.” Donnell's, untimely death in 1927, one year prior to the completion and dedication, prevented him from being a part of these ceremonies. Years earlier, however, Donnell resolved to give the public schools in Findlay an athletic field. His gift of the site where Donnell Middle School currently sits was his first step toward his goal. Donnell's son, Otto and grandsons James C. (II), John R., and Otto D. (Jr.), carried his goal to completion after his death.

A graduate of Case Institute of Technology (now part of Case Western Reserve University), O.D. Donnell called on former classmates to serve as architects for the stadium project and drive it through execution.  It attracted attention statewide, partly because of its unique physical structure for the times. And the fact it was constructed and given to the Findlay City Schools at no cost was quite unusual in that era. Findlay embarked in 1928 on a growing athletic program with no expense to the taxpayer, an envy of many communities throughout the state of Ohio.  O.D. Donnell continued his guidance and financial support for improvements to the stadium from 1928 to 1936, donating tennis courts to the schools in 1928, followed by the combination wading pool and skating rink in 1930.  The largest electronic scoreboard in Ohio was also installed in 1930, along with a public address system.  Lights were added and the first night game was played in 1930 with the Trojans defeating Bowling Green, 13–0.

In 1936 O.D. Donnell established the “Donnell Foundation” to provide ongoing financial support for maintenance and improvements to the stadium and adjacent recreational areas.

Donnell Stadium is still operational where it continues to host football games and other events. Currently, the venue holds numerous attendance records at OHSAA sponsored playoff games.

FieldTurf renovation
FieldTurf was added in 2007. The millions of fibers on the field utilize a silica sand/cryogenic-rubber infill over 9 lbs per square foot (720,000 pounds across the field), creating an even more natural surface. Numerous ridges run from top to bottom alongside each face of the fiber to eliminate breaking points in each artificial grass blade, holding fibers in their place, eliminating wrinkles, and maintaining the integrity of the turf. The resiliency of the fiber cross creates a more durable fiber while on a vertical access so they stay upright.

The artificial playing surface is coated with an advanced hydrological system to combat head on the synthetic surface. Slow released evaporative cooling reduces the temperature not he blades while the ridges on the artificial blades of grass refract sunlight (heat). Radiation from the infill evaporates the moisture creating a cooling effect

Completing the installation of the surface was a drainage system. Since installation, rain outs at Donnell Stadium have not occurred. As opposed to traditional hole punctured artificial playing surface drainage systems, custom rows are integrated to allow 40% more drainage which is certified to drain 40.14 inches of water per hour.

Scoreboard and video board renovation
For the 2012 season, a new scoreboard by Fair Play Scoreboards and video board by Trans-Lux were added. It is capable of displaying a host of multimedia from the internet, including live TV, and is able to display over 280 million colors. 

 
The largest video board for a high school stadium in the state is equipped with a video room onsite to cut to multiple game camera angles, and instant replays (with multiple angles); in addition, a ribbon full matrix board (the first for a high school facility in the nation) lines the press box separating the two levels capable of showing game, player, and statistical information.

FieldTurf renovation

In 2007, Donnell Stadium's Kentucky Bluegrass playing surface was removed for installation of an artificial playing surface: FieldTurf. The color palette of the turf was a nod toward Findlay High School compared to the stadium's secondary tenant, the University of Findlay. A block 'F' at the fifty-yard line, in shaded white with a yellow and blue outline sat at the midpoint of the surface. The end zones both read 'Findlay' in white lettering with a yellow and blue shadow.

After eight years of use, the FieldTurf surface was removed to begin the installation of a newer, more updated version of the FieldTurf product. The synthetic playing field uses FieldTurf's top end Classic HD technology, the same playing surface used by the majority of NFL stadiums. The three layer infill system allows for optimal player safety, while delivering a softer touch and reduced heat mapping. Using polymer process geometry, the turf is 14% less abrasive, reduces water splash by 62%, and is a 130 micron improvement over the previous surface's depth. The top layer consists of cryogenic rubber with the middle being a combination of cryogenic rubber and a silica sand mix. Silica sand fills the third layer which gives added grip to cleats as they dig into the surface.

New with the revised version on the field, each ten-yard line stripe alternates between a light shade of green and a dark shade of green. Before each game a specifically designed tractor 'pushes' the blades one way or another to allow the sunlight to amplify the difference in shading. The 50-yard line graphic and end zone art remain constant with the 2007 installation.

Donnell Stadium is the only high school in the nation to replace its surface in just seven years despite having no issues with the prior surface; this was strictly an upgrade that focused on enhanced player safety, cosmetic differentiation, and upgraded playing surface technology.

The Foundation continues to provide support for these facilities.

Gallery

Renovations
1929 Tennis courts added
1930 Stadium lights added
1930 First night game
1930 Pond added
1978 Pressbox
1999 Current pressbox
2007-14 FieldTurf revolution
2012 Scoreboard and video board
2015 FieldTurf classic HD:

References

College football venues
Findlay Oilers football
High school football venues in Ohio
Sports venues completed in 1928
1928 establishments in Michigan